Crider Creek is a stream in Osage and Gasconade counties of central Missouri.

Crider Creek has the name of the local Crider family.

See also
List of rivers of Missouri

References

Rivers of Gasconade County, Missouri
Rivers of Osage County, Missouri
Rivers of Missouri
Tributaries of the Gasconade River